Wallers-en-Fagne (before 2007: Wallers-Trélon) is a commune in the Nord department in northern France.

Heraldry

Population

See also
Communes of the Nord department

References

Wallersenfagne